The , FAGE (lit. 'Federation of General Administration of the State') is a trade union representing civil servants in France.

The union originated as a split from the National Federation of State Workers, an affiliate of the General Confederation of Labour, by those who objected to the influence of the French Communist Party.  Although only a minority joined the new union, the Federation of General Administration, it included a majority of prefectural workers.  In 1948, it affiliated to Workers' Force, and became a founding affiliate of its General Federation of Public Servants.  In 1953, the small National Economic Federation merged into the union.

By 2002, the union claimed 30,000 members.

External links

References

Civil service trade unions
Trade unions in France
Trade unions established in the 1940s